Facundo García (born 16 December 1999) is an Argentine professional footballer who plays as a central midfielder.

Club career
García started with Olimpo. He was an unused substitute for an Argentine Primera División match with Newell's Old Boys in May 2017, prior to being reintroduced into the first-team in February 2018 and making his professional debut on 5 March during a 1–0 defeat to Estudiantes. On 9 July 2018, García was transferred to Spanish side Leganés; signing a five-year contract. In the following August, he was loaned out to AEK Larnaca of the Cypriot First Division. He was part of the squad that won the 2018 Super Cup against APOEL. He went back to Leganés in June 2019, though would rejoin AEK on loan on 29 August.

García returned to Leganés at the end of June 2020, having made forty-five appearances for AEK Larnaca across two seasons; he also scored his first senior goal in the process, netting in a 5–2 away win over Ethnikos Achna on 11 January 2020. On 4 October, García was loaned to Segunda División B with Valencia CF Mestalla. He was sent off on debut during a 2–2 draw away to Atzeneta on 17 October.

On 6 August 2021, García moved to Primera División RFEF side CE Sabadell FC on a one-year loan.

International career
In April 2018, García was selected to train with the Argentina U19 team. He subsequently received a call-up for their 2018 South American Games squad, and scored on his debut during a draw with Chile.

Career statistics
.

Honours
AEK Larnaca
 Cypriot Super Cup: 2018

References

External links

1999 births
Living people
Sportspeople from Buenos Aires Province
Argentine footballers
Association football midfielders
Argentine Primera División players
Cypriot First Division players
Segunda División B players
Olimpo footballers
CD Leganés players
AEK Larnaca FC players
Valencia CF Mestalla footballers
CE Sabadell FC footballers
Argentina youth international footballers
Argentine expatriate footballers
Argentine expatriate sportspeople in Cyprus
Argentine expatriate sportspeople in Spain
Expatriate footballers in Cyprus
Expatriate footballers in Spain